Suna may refer to:

People
Suuna I of Buganda, king of Buganda until 1609
Suna II of Buganda, king of Buganda from 1836 until 1856
Suna Kan (born 1936), Turkish violinist of classical music
Suna Kıraç (1941–2020), member of the Turkish Koç family
Suna Murray (born 1955), American figure skater

Other
Suna (Espoo), an area of Espoon keskus, Espoo, Finland
Suna (inhabited locality), name of several inhabited localities in Russia
Suna (river), a river in the Republic of Karelia, Russia
Suna (song), a 2008 single by Hatsune Okumura
Suna, a 1999 album by Mar de Copas
Sudan News Agency, Sudan News Agency

Turkish feminine given names